Brass Construction was an American funk group formed in Brooklyn, New York, United States, in 1968. They were originally known as Dynamic Soul, and went on to record a string of hit singles and albums through to 1985.

Career
Signed in 1975 by Sid Maurer, and former United Artists Records promotion man Fred Frank, they scored two US Billboard Hot 100 entries in 1976 - the most successful being "Movin'," which hit #14. They had much more success on the US Hot Dance Club Play chart, with nine chart entries, including "Movin'", which reached #1. Singer, pianist, flautist and arranger Randy Muller went on to score a number of R&B hits with Skyy and B. T. Express.

Over the years, Brass Construction members have included Wade Williamston (bass), Sandy Billups (percussion), Morris Price (trumpet), Larry Payton (drums), Jesse Ward Jr. (saxophone), Michael "Micky" Grudge (saxophone), Wayne Parris (trumpet), Alvin Haskin (original Trombone player on Movin), Duane Cahill (trombone), Joseph Arthur-Wong (guitar), and Randy Muller (lead vocals), later joined by Lee Evans on keyboards.

Brass Construction reunited for a concert on November 28, 2005, at the Bataclan Arena in Paris, France.

Joseph Arthur-Wong died in 1998. Jesse Ward Jr. died in 2016. Drummer Larry Payton died on March 21, 2016.

Discography

Studio albums

Compilation albums
Golden Classics (1991, Collectables)
The Best of Brass Construction: Movin' & Changin''' (1993, EMI)Get Up to Get Down: Brass Construction's Funky Feeling (1997, Capitol)Classic Masters (2002, EMI/Capitol)Something for the Weekend: 10 Extended Soul Weekender Classics'' (2006, Stateside)

Singles

Band members
Randy Muller – Keyboards/ Lead vocals
Wade Williamston – Bass
Joseph Arthur-Wong (d.1998) – Guitar
Larry Payton (1955 – March 21, 2016) – Drums
Jesse Ward Jr. (d.2016) – Saxophone
Michael "Micky" Grudge – Saxophone
Wayne Parris – Trumpet
Morris Price – Trumpet
Sandy Billups – Percussion

See also
List of Billboard number-one dance club songs
List of artists who reached number one on the U.S. Dance Club Songs chart

References

External links
Official website
 
Randy Muller's official website
BBC.co.uk review

American funk musical groups
American dance music groups
American soul musical groups